CCC may refer to:

Arts and entertainment 
 Canada's Capital Cappies, the Critics and Awards Program in Ottawa, Ontario, Canada
 Capcom Classics Collection, a 2005 compilation of arcade games for the PlayStation 2 and Xbox
 CCC, the production code for the 1970 Doctor Who serial The Ambassadors of Death

Music 
 Canadian Chamber Choir, a national choral ensemble for Canadian singers, conductors and composers
 "Candy Cane Children", a single by The White Stripes
 The Color Changin' Click, a rap group which was started by rapper Chamillionaire

Christianity 
 Calvinist Cadet Corps, Christian mentoring organization
 Campus Crusade for Christ, the original name of the interdenominational Christian organization now known as Cru
 Canadian Council of Churches, an ecumenical Christian forum of churches in Canada
 Catechism of the Catholic Church, an official exposition (catechism) of the teachings of the Roman Catholic Church
 Celestial Church of Christ, an independent African Church
 Central Congregational Church (Providence, Rhode Island), a United Church of Christ congregation
 China Christian Council, a government-approved Christian organization in the People's Republic of China
 Christian City Churches, an evangelical, Pentecostal church movement founded by Pastors Phil Pringle and Chris Pringle
 Christian Cultural Center, a New York City-based church pastored by Dr. A. R. Bernard
 Church of Christ in China, one of the Chinese Independent Churches
 Clearwater Christian College, a four-year non-denominational Christian College
 Colorado Community Church, an interdenominational church in Denver, Colorado, U.S.
 Community Christian College, a two-year college based in Redlands, California, U.S.

Companies 
 Canadian Commercial Corporation, a Canadian corporation responsible for facilitating international contracts
 Canterbury of New Zealand, a New Zealand-based sports apparel company
 CCC Film, a film production company in Germany, formally known as Central Cinema Compagnie-Film GmbH
 Cloud Credential Council, a global provider of vendor-neutral certification programs for the information technology (IT) industry
 Color Climax Corporation, a Danish pornography company
 Comcast Cable Communications, a cable television, internet and telephone service provider in the United States
 Commodity Credit Corporation, United States owned corporation which funds USDA programs
 Consolidated Contractors Company, a large Middle Eastern and International EPC Contractor
 Cooper Cameron Corporation, now Cameron International Corporation
 Copyright Clearance Center, a U.S. copyright collection company
 Crane Carrier Company, a U.S. truck manufacturer
 Cwmni Cyfyngedig Cyhoeddus, a Welsh form of public limited company

Education

In the U.S. 
 California Community Colleges System, combined districts of California's community colleges
 Camden County College, Camden County, New Jersey
 Cascadia Community College, Bothell, Washington, now known as Cascadia College
 Cayuga Community College, 2-year SUNY college in Cayuga County, New York
 Center for Computational Chemistry, research center in the department of Chemistry at the University of Georgia
 Central Community College (Nebraska)
 Chemeketa Community College, Salem, Oregon
 City Colleges of Chicago, a system of seven community colleges for Chicago residents
 Clackamas Community College, Oregon City, Oregon
 Clatsop Community College, Clatsop County, Oregon
 Clearwater Central Catholic High School, college preparatory school in Clearwater, Florida
 Cleveland Chiropractic College, chiropractic school in Overland Park, Kansas
 Cleveland Community College, Shelby, North Carolina
 Clinton Community College (Iowa), Clinton, Iowa
 Clovis Community College (New Mexico), Clovis, New Mexico
Club Coordination Council, University of Notre Dame, Notre Dame, Indiana
 Coahoma Community College, unincorporated Coahoma County, Mississippi, near Clarksdale
 Coconino County Community College, Flagstaff, Arizona
 Compton Community College, near Los Angeles, California
 Contra Costa College, San Pablo, California
 Corning Community College, 2-year SUNY college in Corning, Steuben County, New York
 Cross-cultural center, a department at various universities
 Cumberland County College, Cumberland County, New Jersey
 Cuyahoga Community College, Cuyahoga County, Ohio

In other places 
 Canadian Computing Competition, a national programming competition for secondary school students in Canada
 Castleknock Community College, public secondary school in Carpenterstown, Dublin, Ireland
 Cebu College of Commerce and Cebu Central Colleges, the former names of the University of Cebu in Cebu, Philippines
 Central Coast Campuses, three education campuses on the Central Coast of New South Wales
 Central Commerce Collegiate, high school in Toronto, Ontario, Canada
 Centro de Capacitación Cinematográfica, film school in Mexico City
 Chenab College, Chiniot, Institute in Pakistan
 Chessington Community College, secondary school and sixth form college in the Royal Borough of Kingston upon Thames
 City College of Calamba, public college in the Philippines
 Cooloola Christian College, Gympie, Queensland, Australia
 Corpus Christi College (disambiguation), the name of several colleges
 Countesthorpe Community College, Leicestershire, Countesthorpe, Great Britain

Law 
 California Coastal Commission
 Central Criminal Court (disambiguation)
 China Compulsory Certificate, a compulsory safety mark for many products sold on the Chinese market
 Citizens' Committee for Children
 Civil Constitution of the Clergy, a law
 Constitutio Criminalis Carolina, the first body of German criminal law
 Convention on Cybercrime by the Council of Europe
 Corruption and Crime Commission of Western Australia
 Cox's Criminal Cases, a series of law reports
 Crime and Corruption Commission, independent entity of Queensland, Australia, created to combat major crime

Civil authorities 
 Cambridge City Council (disambiguation)
 Cardiff City Council, the governing body for Cardiff
 Carmarthenshire County Council, the administrative authority for the county of Carmarthenshire, Wales
 Casino control commission, a variation of a gaming control board in the U.S.
 Central Communications Command, the command-and-control system for London's police services
 Chittagong City Corporation, a governing organisation in southeastern Bangladesh
 Christchurch City Council, New Zealand

Organizations and organizing

Conservation 
 2009 United Nations Climate Change Conference, held at the Bella Center in Copenhagen, Denmark
 California Conservation Corps, a state agency modeled after the Civilian Conservation Corps of the 1930s
 Cetacean Conservation Center, a Chilean organization dedicated to the conservation of cetaceans and other marine mammals
 Civilian Conservation Corps, a major New Deal program in the U.S. for young men, 1933–42
 Climate Change Committee, an independent non-departmental public body, formed in 2008 to advise UK Government

Politics 
 Center for Community Change, a progressive community organizing group in the United States
 Citizens Coalition For Change, a Zimbabwean political party
 Climate Change Coalition, Australian political party
 Command for Hunting Communists, a Brazilian paramilitary terrorist group of the 1960s known as Comando de Caça aos Comunistas
 Committee on Climate Change, an independent body established by the UK Government to advise on climate change policy
 Communist Combatant Cells, a Belgian terrorist organization of the 1980s committed to a Communist ideology
 Communist Committee of Cabinda, a separatist group in the Cabinda exclave of Angola
 Council of Conservative Citizens, a United States paleoconservative white separatist political organization
 Customs Cooperation Council, an intergovernmental organization that helps Members communicate and cooperate on customs issues

Science and technology 
 Comb ceramic culture
 Climatic climax community, a biological community of plants and animals which has reached a steady state
 Conformal cyclic cosmology, a cosmological model in which the universe undergoes a repeated cycle of death and rebirth
 Countercurrent chromatography, a chromatographic separations-science technique
 Cryogenic current comparator, electronic test equipment
 CCC, a codon for the amino acid proline

Computing 
 Catalyst Control Center, control panel for AMD Catalyst drivers
 Chaos Computer Club, one of the biggest and most influential hacker organisations
 Chaos Communication Congress, an annual meeting of computer hackers organized by the Chaos Computer Club
 Chaos Communication Camp, a quadrennial international meeting of hackers organized by the Chaos Computer Club
 Citizen Cyberscience Centre, Switzerland-based volunteer computing organisation
 Computational Complexity Conference, academic conference in the field of theoretical computer science
 Corsham Computer Centre, an underground British government installation near RAF Corsham and RAF Rudloe Manor in the heavily tunneled Corsham area of Wiltshire
 Cray Computer Corporation, a defunct computer company
 Color Cell Compression, an algorithm developed to compress digital color images

Mathematics 
 Cartesian closed category, a concept in category theory
 CCC, Roman numeral for 300
 Countable chain condition, a condition in order theory and topology
 Cube-connected cycles, a graph used as a communications network topology

Medicine 
 Capsulorhexis or capsulorrhexis, also known as continuous curvilinear capsulorhexis, a type of cataract surgery
 Clinical Care Classification System, a nursing terminology consisting of nursing diagnoses, nursing interventions, and nursing action types that assist in documenting the nursing process
 Convenient care clinic, a health care clinic located in neighborhoods

Sport 
 CAF Confederation Cup, the annual international football competition held in the CAF region
 California Coast Classic Bike Tour, an annual fundraising cycling event
 Cascade Collegiate Conference, an NAIA athletic conference in the Pacific Northwest
 Cascade Cycling Classic, a competitive multi-stage bicycle road race, held every July in Bend, Oregon
 CCC Pro Team, a UCI WorldTeam cycling team based in Poland
 Central Connecticut Conference, an interscholastic athletic conference in greater Hartford, Connecticut, U.S.
 Charlottetown Civic Centre, an indoor ice hockey venue in Canada
 Colombo Cricket Club, a cricket club in Colombo, Sri Lanka
 Commonwealth Coast Conference, an NCAA Division III athletic conference in New England
 Compton Cricket Club, a California exhibition cricket club
 County cricket club, any of the clubs participating in the County Championship or the Minor Counties Championship
 Courmayeur - Champex - Chamonix, a 101 km running race along a portion of the Ultra-Trail du Mont-Blanc
 Cross Country Canada, the governing body for cross country skiing in Canada

Other uses 
 California Correctional Center, a state prison in the United States
 Carly Colón (born 1979), also known as Carlito Caribbean Cool, a Puerto Rican professional wrestler
 Cash Conversion Cycle, a cost accounting term that refers to the liquidity risk posed by growth
 Certified Chef de Cuisine, a professional title
 Chapman code or Chapman County Code, a set of 3-letter codes used in genealogy to identify administrative divisions in the UK, Ireland, the Isle of Man and the Channel Islands
 Colorado Cryptologic Center, a U.S. National Security Agency facility
 Command, control, and communications, a concept in military doctrine
 Country calling code
 Crescent City Connection, twin cantilever bridges
 tripleC: Communication, Capitalism & Critique, a peer-reviewed academic journal of communication studies
 Jardines del Rey Airport, Cuba, by IATA code

See also 
 Triple C's, popular nickname for the rap group Carol City Cartel
 CC (disambiguation)
 C3 (disambiguation)
 CCCC (disambiguation)
 300
Fate/Extra CCC